Puttur (Pronunciation:) is a city in Dakshina Kannada district, in Karnataka state of India.  The Puttur Shree Mahalingeshwara Temple is located here.

Geography 

Demographics 
As of 2011 India census, Puttur had a population of 48,063. Males constitute 50% of the population and females 50%. Hinduism is the major religion constitute 65%, Muslims are about 22%, Christianity constitute 6% and other religions constitute 7%.

Temple
Puttur Shree Mahalingeshwara Temple is a 12th-century temple, located in Puttur, Dakshina Kannada in the Indian state of Karnataka. Lord Shiva (popularly known as Puttur Mahalingeshwara) is the main deity.

Local news paper
Suddi Bidugade is leading daily local news paper which is famous in the taluk. They have their e papers available free of cost online 
They have also live online news portal which is providing reliable local news entire day.

Languages
Tulu is the native mother tongue of most people in Puttur Taluk. A steady large scale migration of Malayalis from neighbouring Kerala 
into the Taluk has made Malayalam the 2nd most spoken language, followed by the state official language, Kannada.

Climate

References

External links

Villages & Towns in Puttur Taluka of Dakshina Kannada, Karnataka

Hot springs of India
Cities and towns in Dakshina Kannada district
Landforms of Karnataka